Stuck  is the third studio album by American hard rock band Adelitas Way, it was released on July 29, 2014. The album was produced by Nick Raskulinecz, and it was released through Virgin Records. "Dog on a Leash" is the first single, while the title track "Stuck" was released as a promotional single from the album. Pre-Order on iTunes for "Stuck" was started on May 20, 2014.

History
The record was Produced by Nick Raskulinecz and was recorded in Rock Falcon Studio in Nashville, Tennessee in early September and ended on November 27, 2013. The band first played the tracks "Stuck" and "We Came" on September 22, 2013 at the Birthday Bear Bash in Ft. Wayne Indiana.

Album title meaning
Frontman Rick DeJesus spoke with The Pulse of Radio about the significance of the title. "I've seen through the eyes of so many people, from my friends to just my peers, myself, everyone — at some point, you know, they feel stuck in life, they feel like their feet are in the mud," he said. "You know, they feel like they're trying to pull out and trying to move forward and trying to grow, and just sometimes you can't."

Singles
"Dog on a Leash" is the first single from Stuck and was released on April 8, 2014. The music video was released exclusively on April 29, 2014. The song reached number seven on the U.S. Mainstream Rock Chart. "Save the World" was announced as the second single and was released on September 12, 2014.

Track listing

Personnel
 Rick DeJesus – lead vocals
 Robert Zakaryan – guitars
 Trevor "Tre" Stafford – drums, percussion
 Andrew Cushing – bass guitar

References

External links
Blabbermouth.net

2014 albums
Adelitas Way albums
Virgin Records albums
Albums produced by Nick Raskulinecz